Crimona pallimedia is a species of moth in the family Noctuidae (the owlet moths). It is found in North America.

References

Further reading

 
 
 

Amphipyrinae
Articles created by Qbugbot
Moths described in 1902